Soo K. Chan (born 1962) is an architect based in Singapore. He is the founding principal and design director of SCDA Architects Pte Ltd, a multi-disciplinary firm engaging in the practice of architecture, interior, landscape and product design.

Academic career
Chan obtained his Bachelor of Arts degree from Washington University in St. Louis and Master of Architecture degree at Yale University. He has taught and lectured in several international architectural schools including National University of Singapore, Syracuse University, Tamkang University, Taipei, University of Paris and Notre Dame University. He is currently a practicing professor at the National University of Singapore. Chan cites Louis Kahn, Otto Wagner, Le Corbusier, and Mies van der Rohe as design inspirations.

Other career 
Chan has served on the Singapore Design Council and the Singapore Design Advisory Panel for the Urban Redevelopment Authority and the Housing Development Board.

He is listed as one of the designers of Poliform and has a line of furniture called Soori.

Chan is also a developer for his debut NYC project Soori High Line  and is the owner-designer-manager of Soori Bali.

Personal life
Chan was born and raised in Khoo Kongsi, Penang, Malaysia. He currently resides in Singapore with his wife Ling, a designer, and their children.

Accolades and mentions
Chan was the recipient of the inaugural Singapore President's Design Award.

Chan was conferred as a Fellow of the Singapore Institute of Architects in recognition for his standing in the profession and advancement of architecture. His works have been published in international architecture and design journals and books, including Architectural Review, Architectural Record, Interni, Lotus, Monument, World Architecture and SURFACE.

Chan  and SCDA projects have also been featured in The New York Times, Wall Street Journal, BBC News, Financial Times, and more. Chan was selected one of the "Top 20 People in NYC Real Estate" by the New York Post – Alexa, Singapore Tatler's "100 People You Should Know in Asia" and The Peak magazine's "30/30 Game Changers."

References

1962 births
Living people
Singaporean architects
Singaporean people of Chinese descent
Malaysian emigrants to Singapore
Washington University in St. Louis alumni
Yale School of Architecture alumni
Academic staff of the National University of Singapore